= GB Chiran =

Nepali actor and model

- जीबी चिरन
- Born: Chiranjibi Sapkota; 14 April 1994 (age 32); Surkhet, Nepal
- Occupation: Model
- Known for: Model

GB Chiran (Nepali :जीबी चिरन), whose real name is Chiranjibi Sapkota, is a Nepali actor and model. He is known for his emotional acting style and contributions to music videos.

== Awards and nominations ==
SN	Award title	Award category	Notable work	Result	ref
1	Epic Nepal Music Award	Best Modern Song Model - Male	Dhururu	nominated	
2	10th Music Khabar Music Award - 2022	Best Music Video Model	Railko Bato	nominated	

== Music videos ==
SN	Name	Release date	ref
1	Raiko Bato		
2	Hera Yo Mutu Ma		
3	Dhururu		
4	Bhana k Thiyo		
5	Sara sansar yaktharphi		
6	Jaya Mahadev		
7	MotarBato		
